Naubates is a genus of lice belonging to the family Philopteridae.

The species of this genus are found in Australia and New Zealand.

Species:
 Naubates clypeatus (Giebel, 1874) 
 Naubates damma Timmermann, 1961

References

Lice